Mandilaria is a red Greek wine grape variety that is grown throughout the Greek Isles. The grape is often used as a blending component, producing deeply colored wines that are light bodied.

Synonyms
Mandilaria is also known under the synonyms Amorgiano, Amourguiano, Armorgiano, Dombrena Mavri, Domvrena Mavri, Doubraina Mavri, Doubrena Mavri, Doumbrena Mavri, Doumpraina Mavri, Doympraina Mavre, K'ntoura Kai M'ntoura, Kontoura, Koudoura Mavri, Koundour A Mavri, Koundoura Mavri, Kountoura, Kountoura Mavri, Kountoyro, Koutoura, Koyntoura, 
Koyntoura Mavre, Kytoura, Mandalari, Mandilari, Mantelaria, Mantilari, Mantilaria, Montoyra, and Tsoumpraina Mavri.

References

Grape varieties of Greece
Red wine grape varieties